The Misamis Oriental Meteors is a Philippine basketball team that is a participant in the third-tier (after the PBA and the PBL) community league Liga Pilipinas. It is based in the province of Misamis Oriental in Mindanao, and its main sponsor is the provincial governor, Gov. Oscar Moreno. The team won the National Finals of the Second Conference of the Liga Pilipinas against the First Conference Champions M Lhuillier Kuwarta Padala - Cebu Niños, 3-2. The Meteors were also in the National Finals of the Third Conference of the Liga, which they lost to the same team (MLKP-Cebu).
The Meteors also represented the Philippines in the 2nd China-Asean Basketball Tournament held in Pingguo County, Guangxi, China in October 18–24, 2009,
winning the championship by beating the Guangxi basketball team and had an elimination-round average of 92.5 points. The Meteors successfully defended their title in the 2010 edition by again beating Guangxi by 96-67. The Meteors participated in the Tournament of the Philippines (TOP), a merger of the Philippine Basketball League and Liga Pilipinas.

Roster

Notable players
Mark Moreno
Khiel Misa
Eder John Saldua
Ronald Lamocha
Arden Guiyab
Francis Barcellano
Lyndon Gudez
Ron Capati
Egay Billones
Dino Daa
Ardy Larong
JR Gerilla
Ken Bono
Rudy Lingganay
Mark Yee
Joey Mente
Jeff Bombeo
Jerome Paterno
Dexter Micutuan

Former players
Players who formerly played for the Meteors were MVP Mark Yee (signed up with Burger King in the PBA), Joey Mente, Jeff Bombeo, Jerome Paterno and Dexter Micutuan.

References

Liga Pilipinas teams
Sports in Misamis Oriental